Merit-Ptah ("Beloved of Ptah") was thought to be a female chief physician of the pharaoh's court during the Second Dynasty of Egypt, c. 2700 BCE; she is purportedly referred as such on an inscription left on her grave at Saqqara by her son.

However, in recent times it has been argued that she most likely never existed, being a modern 1938 invention of a Canadian feminist called Kate Campbell Hurd-Mead.  Jakub Kwiecinski, a historian at the University of Colorado, was cited by secondary source Newsweek arguing that the made-up story of Merit-Ptah exemplifies how "seemingly well-sourced Wikipedia articles" can mislead, and he cautioned against over-reliance on secondary sources.

History
Merit-Ptah first appears in literature in a 1937 book by Kate Campbell Hurd-Mead on female doctors. Campbell Hurd-Mead presents two ancient Egyptian female doctors, an unnamed one dating to the Fifth Dynasty and Merit-Ptah, dating evidently to the New Kingdom as Hurd-Mead states that she is shown in the Valley of the Kings (the burial ground of Egyptian kings from about 1500 BCE to 1080 BCE). The unnamed Old Kingdom female doctor is most likely Peseshet who is known from a tomb of the period. Later authors did not notice that Kate Campbell Hurd-Mead presented two doctors and mixed the data of the two women; Merit-Ptah was thus back-dated to the Old Kingdom.

A female doctor Merit-Ptah is not known from any other Ancient Egyptian source, and no research publication listing doctors mentions her. A namesake, yet completely unrelated woman was the wife of Ramose, the Governor of Thebes and Vizier under Akhenaten, and she is depicted along with her husband in TT55 in Sheikh Abd el-Qurna.

The International Astronomical Union named the impact crater Merit Ptah on Venus after her.

References

 Kampp, Friederike: Die Thebanische Nekropole (Mainz: Zabern, 1996), Vol. I, p. 262.
 

27th-century BC women
Ancient Egyptian physicians
Ancient Egyptian medicine
Ancient women physicians
Egyptian women scientists
Ancient women scientists
Women medical researchers
Nonexistent people